Funiculaire du Châtelard is a former funicular railway at Emosson dam in the canton of Valais, Switzerland. It leads from Le Châtelard 1129 m to Château d'Eau at 1821 m. It is part of Parc d'Attractions Verticalp, closed in 2022. The line has a length of 1302 m at a maximum incline of 87% and a difference of elevation of 693 m. The single-track line has two cars and a passing loop.

History 
The funicular was built in 1921 for the Swiss Federal Railways by Von Roll at the construction of the Barberine dam and opened to the public in 1935. It was also used for the construction of the Emosson dam (completed 1972).

As of 2023, the line is owned by "Parc d'Attractions du Châtelard VS S.A.", previously named "Trains Touristiques d'Emosson SA" and "Société anonyme des transports Emosson-Barberine". In the 1970s, when the SBB-CFF planned to close the funicular, it was acquired by the newly formed company.

The company entered restructuring in July 2022. In 2023 its website announced that another company may resume its operations.

Notes

References 

fr:Verticalp_Emosson#Le_Funiculaire_à_la_pente_championne
de:Parc_d’Attractions_du_Châtelard#Historische_Standseilbahn
Chatelard
Transport in Valais
Metre gauge railways in Switzerland
Railway lines opened in 1921
Railway lines closed in 2022